Comet 81P/Wild, also known as Wild 2 (pronounced "vilt two"), is a comet named after Swiss astronomer Paul Wild, who discovered it on January 6, 1978, using a 40-cm Schmidt telescope at Zimmerwald, Switzerland.

For most of its 4.5 billion-year lifetime, Wild 2 probably had a more distant and Circular orbit. In September 1974, it passed within one million kilometers of the planet Jupiter, the strong gravitational pull of which perturbed the comet's orbit and brought it into the inner Solar System. Its orbital period changed from 43 years to about 6 years, and its perihelion is now about 1.59 astronomical unit (AU).

Nucleus parameters 
 Dimensions: 
 Density: 
 Mass: 2.3 x 1013 kg (5.1 x 1013 lb)

Exploration 

NASA's Stardust Mission launched a spacecraft, named Stardust, on February 7, 1999.  It flew by Wild 2 on January 2, 2004, and collected particle samples from the comet's coma, which were returned to Earth along with interstellar dust it collected during the journey. Seventy-two close-up shots were taken of Wild 2 by Stardust. They revealed a surface riddled with flat-bottomed depressions, with sheer walls and other features that range from very small to up to 2 kilometres across. These features are believed to be caused by impact craters or gas vents. During Stardusts flyby, at least 10 gas vents were active. The comet itself has a diameter of 5 kilometres.

Stardusts "sample return canister" was reported to be in excellent condition when it landed in Utah, on January 15, 2006. A NASA team analyzed the particle capture cells and removed individual grains of comet and interstellar dust, then sent them to about 150 scientists around the globe.  NASA is collaborating with The Planetary Society who will run a project called "Stardust@Home", using volunteers to help locate particles on the Stardust Interstellar Dust Collector (SIDC).

As of 2006, the composition of the dust has contained a wide range of organic compounds, including two that contain biologically usable nitrogen. Indigenous aliphatic hydrocarbons were found with longer chain lengths than those observed in the diffuse interstellar medium. No hydrous silicates or carbonate minerals were detected, which suggests a lack of aqueous processing of Wild 2 dust. Very few pure carbon (CHON) particles were found in the samples returned. A substantial amount of crystalline silicates such as olivine, anorthite and diopside were found, materials only formed at high temperature. This is consistent with previous observations of crystalline silicates both in cometary tails and in circumstellar disks at large distances from the star. Possible explanations for this high temperature material at large distances from Sun were summarised before the Stardust sample return mission by van Boekel et al.:

"Both in the Solar System and in circumstellar disks crystalline silicates are found at large distances from the star. The origin of these silicates is a matter of debate. Although in the hot inner-disk regions crystalline silicates can be produced by means of gas-phase condensation or thermal annealing, the typical grain temperatures in the outer-disk (2–20 au) regions are far below the glass temperature of silicates of approx 1,000 K. The crystals in these regions may have been transported outward through the disk or in an outward-flowing wind. An alternative source of crystalline silicates in the outer disk regions is in situ annealing, for example by shocks or lightning. A third way to produce crystalline silicates is the collisional destruction of large parent bodies in which secondary processing has taken place. We can use the mineralogy of the dust to derive information about the nature of the primary and/or secondary processes the small-grain population has undergone."

Results from a study reported in the September 19, 2008 issue of the journal Science has revealed an oxygen isotope signature in the dust that suggests an unexpected mingling of rocky material between the center and edges of the Solar System. Despite the comet's birth in the icy reaches of outer space beyond Pluto, tiny crystals collected from its halo appear to have been forged in the hotter interior, much closer to the Sun.

In April 2011, scientists from the University of Arizona discovered evidence of the presence of liquid water. They found iron and copper sulfide minerals that must have formed in the presence of water. The discovery is in conflict with the existing paradigm that comets never get warm enough to melt their icy bulk. Either collisions or radiogenic heating might have provided the necessary energy source.

On August 14, 2014, scientists announced the collection of possible interstellar dust particles from the Stardust spacecraft since returning to Earth in 2006.

Gallery

See also 
Wild 2 has a similar name to other objects:
 116P/Wild
 1941 Wild
 63P/Wild
 86P/Wild

Notes

References

External links 
 NASA/JPL homepage for Stardust project
 Stardust@Home Volunteer Particle Analysis Project
 81P/Wild orbit and observations at IAU Minor Planet Center

Periodic comets
0081
 
Comets visited by spacecraft
Comets in 2016
19780106